The Cambridge Computer Lab Ring is a members' association for staff and graduates of the Cambridge University Computer Laboratory. It was formed in 2002 as a non-profit, independent and voluntary members’ association, but was absorbed into the Cambridge University Computer Laboratory in 2012. It was named by Maurice Wilkes.

The association was mentioned by Richard Lambert in the Lambert Review of Business-University Collaboration as an example of how "universities, departments and faculties should develop their alumni networks in order to build closer relationships with their graduates working in the business community."

Hall of Fame
The association claims that, as of January 2018, there are 267 companies created by computer lab graduates and staff. A 'Company of the Year' is chosen from this list annually.

 2005 Sophos
 2006 Codian
 2007 Jagex
 2008 Xensource
 2009 Linguamatics
 2010 Ubisense
 2011 RealVNC
 2012 Trampoline Systems
 2013 Raspberry Pi
 2014 DeepMind Technologies
 2015 SwiftKey
 2016 Unikernel Systems
 2017 Improbable
 2018 Bromium
 2019 PolyAI
 2020 DisplayLink
 2021 iKVA

References

External links
Cambridge Computer Lab Ring
Lambert Review of Business-University Collaboration December 2003

2002 establishments in England
Organizations established in 2002
Computer
University of Cambridge Computer Laboratory